Steppin' Out is a 1976 album containing the works of Neil Sedaka. In America it was the third and final album of a trilogy of albums issued by The Rocket Record Company. (Rocket would issue a compilation album, Neil Sedaka's Greatest Hits, in 1977; but it contained no new material.) Outside America Steppin' Out was issued on the Polydor label. In 1998, the Varèse Sarabande label reissued Steppin' Out and included four bonus tracks.

The title track, a #36 hit in the U.S., featured backing vocals by Sedaka's labelmate, Elton John.

Track listing

Side One
 "Sing Me"
 "You Gotta Make Your Own Sunshine"
 "No. 1 with a Heartache"
 "Steppin' Out"
 "Love in the Shadows"
 "Cardboard California"

Side Two
 "Here We Are Falling In Love Again"
 "I Let You Walk Away"
 "Good Times, Good Music, Good Friends"
 "Perfect Strangers"
 "Bad and Beautiful"
 "Summer Nights"

Singles and EPs
Many of the songs on this album were released on 45 rpm singles; some were even included on a 33-1/3 rpm EP album in the UK. Those songs that saw such a release are as follows:
 "Love in the Shadows" (No. 16 on US pop charts in 1976)
 "Steppin' Out" (No. 36 on US pop charts in 1976)
 "I Let You Walk Away" (B-side of "Steppin' Out")
 "No. 1 With A Heartache" (issued as a 45 rpm single in the UK on Polydor label; not issued on a 45 in the US)
 "Good Times, Good Music, Good Friends" (B-side of "No. 1 With A Heartache" in the UK)
 "You Gotta Make Your Own Sunshine" (No. 52 on US pop charts in late 1976-early 1977)
 "Perfect Strangers" (B-side of "You Gotta Make Your Own Sunshine")

In 1976, Polydor issued an EP in the UK entitled, "Make Your Own Sunshine". This EP included "You Gotta Make Your Own Sunshine" and "Summer Nights" along with "Tit For Tat" and "New York City Blues", two songs from earlier Neil Sedaka albums.

Varese Sarabande re-release
In 1998, Varèse Sarabande reissued Steppin' Out and included the following bonus tracks:

(13) "(Baby) Don't Let It Mess Your Mind" (B-side of "Love in the Shadows" in the US)
(14) "Time Waits For No One" (it is unknown when this song was recorded)
(15) "(Is This the Way to) Amarillo" (from the Elektra album A Song; No. 44 on US pop charts in 1977)
(16) "Should've Never Let You Go" (duet with daughter Dara Sedaka; from the Elektra album In the Pocket; No. 19 on US pop charts in 1980)

Notes
 The songs "Sing Me" and "Cardboard California" were new versions of songs that Sedaka had originally recorded in 1971 for the RCA album Emergence
 The bonus song "(Baby) Don't Let It Mess Your Mind" was a new version of a song that had originally been recorded in 1972 for the RCA album Solitaire
 "Sing Me" was covered by other artists such as Lou Christie and Helen Reddy, while "Baby, Don't Let It Mess Your Mind" has been covered by other artists, including Yvonne Elliman.
 Elton John served as a backup vocal on the title song "Steppin' Out" just as he had done for Sedaka during his recording of "Bad Blood" in 1975.
 NBC-TV promoted the release of this album with a primetime TV special, also titled Steppin' Out, in 1976.
 The song "Bad And Beautiful" has proven quite popular with Neil Sedaka's fans in Mexico, and with other Spanish-speaking fans throughout Latin America.
 "Bad And Beautiful" was reworked for the 1985 anime Mobile Suit Zeta Gundam as the series' ending theme, Hoshizora no Believe (星空のBelieve lit. "Believe in the Starry Sky"), sung by Mami Ayukawa.

1976 albums
Neil Sedaka albums
The Rocket Record Company albums